Preston K. Covey, Jr. (29 August 1942 - 18 September 2006) was the head of the philosophy department at Carnegie Mellon University, Pittsburgh, Pennsylvania, United States, during the later part of the twentieth century. Covey, who earned his Ph.D. jointly through the philosophy department and the humanities graduate programs at Stanford University, founded the Center for the Advancement of Applied Ethics (CAAE).

The Covey Award is named after him.

References

1942 births
2006 deaths
Carnegie Mellon University faculty
20th-century American philosophers